Enfield and Haringey Athletic Club is an athletics club based in North London.
The club has tracks in two locations;
Lee Valley Athletics Centre and
New River Stadium.

History

Enfield and Haringey AC was formed in 1999 with the merger of Borough of Enfield Harriers (BoEH) and Haringey AC. BoEH was created in 1965 by the amalgamation of Enfield AC, founded 1920, and Ponders End AC (1922). Haringey AC was originally Southgate Harriers, a club formed in 1932 by a breakaway group from the Southgate & Wood Green Sports Association. In 1974, Southgate AC moved its HQ from Broomfield Park to White Hart Lane Community Sports Centre and adopted the title Haringey & Southgate AC which was later shortened to Haringey AC.

Honours

Senior Men:
 British Athletics League
 First place: 1984, 1986, 1988, 1990, 1991, 1993
 Second place: 1981, 1982, 1983, 1987, 1989, 1992
 Third place: 1985, 1995
 European Champion Clubs Cup
 Second place: 1992
 Third place: 1985, 2008
National U17 Champions for 8 successive years
National U20 Champions for 9 successive years
European U20 Champions in 2003 and finalists for past 7 years.

Most recently, National Young Athletes League Final, September 2006. In doing so, stopping the three year strangle hold on the title by Blackheath and Bromley Harriers.

Notable athletes
Enfield and Haringey AC, and while under its former names, has produced a considerable number of successful athletes.

Olympians

Other
Bernard Eeles: 800 meters 1934 Commonwealth Games, Sydney.
Leon Baptiste: 200 meters 2010 Commonwealth Games
Graham Eggleton:
Wayne Griffith:
Bill Land:
Kike Oniwinde:
Keith Stock:
Hugh Teape:
Solomon Wariso:

References

External links
Official Club Website
Lee Valley Athletics Centre
New River Stadium
Queen Elizabeth Stadium

Athletics clubs in England
1999 establishments in England
Running clubs in the United Kingdom
Athletics clubs in London
Sports clubs established in 1999